The Czech Republic's Nicole Vaidišová was the defending champion, but decided to compete in the 2006 Kremlin Cup, which was held in the same week at Moscow, Russia.

Vania King won the title, defeating Tamarine Tanasugarn in the final. This was King's 1st title of her career.

Seeds

Draw

Finals

Top half

Bottom half

Qualifying

Seeds

Qualifiers

Lucky losers

Qualifying draw

First qualifier

Second qualifier

Third qualifier

Fourth qualifier

References 
 Draws at ITF Tennis 
 Draws at Tennis Quickfound

Singles
PTT Bangkok Open - Singles
 in women's tennis